= JŽ series 312 =

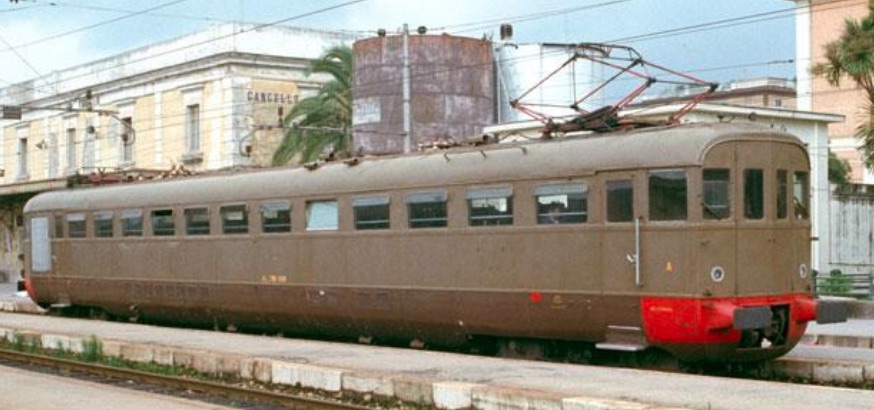
Italian railcar ALe 790.009, very similar to the ALe 880

The JŽ Series 312 is an electric motor unit series once belonged to Jugoslovenske Željeznice.

They were former ALe 880 of the Italian railways wo were left in Yugoslavia after the 2nd World war.

This class was put into service in 1950.

The route was Ljubljana-Sežana-Rijeka.

There were two subseries 000 and 100.
